Downhill is a 2016 Chilean thriller film directed by Patricio Valladares and written by Barry Keating and Valladares.

Plot
After his best friend dies in a racing accident, biking star Joe agrees to participate in a exhibition race in Chile. While on a test run with his girlfriend, Stephanie, they stumble upon a badly injured man who is dying from a mysterious virus. This discovery sets off a chain of events that leads to a dangerous situation as they become the targets of ruthless killers who will do anything to keep their secret from leaving the mountains.

Cast
 Natalie Burn as Stephanie 
 Bryce Draper as Joe
 Eyal Meyer as Charlie
 Ariel Levy as Pablo
 Ignacia Allamand as Magdalena
 Luke Massy as Alpha Hunter
 Andrés Gómez as Skynny Hunter
 Vittorio Farfán as Young Hunter
 Lisseth Candia as Woman Hunter
 Cristian Cuentrejo as Old Hunter
 Elvis Stallone as Biker Hunter
 Matías López as The Stranger
 Priscilla Luciano as Old Woman

Production
The filming began on May 15, 2015 in Chile, and ended in the mid-June. Mixing GoPro footage and stunning cinematography of the mesmerizing Chilean wilderness, Downhill slowly transforms from a sports movie into a body horror tale just as the characters are transformed by something hidden inside them just waiting to burst out…

Festival awards
Winner: Bloody Work in progress, Blood Window, Ventana Sur (Argentina)

References

External links
 

2016 horror films
2016 horror thriller films
Films directed by Patricio Valladares
Films shot in Chile
2010s English-language films
Chilean horror thriller films
2010s Chilean films
2010s Spanish-language films
Films set in Chile